Helichochaetus is a genus of flies in the family Dolichopodidae. It contains only one species, Helichochaetus discifer, and is found in New Zealand.

References 

Dolichopodidae genera
Hydrophorinae
Diptera of New Zealand
Monotypic Diptera genera
Taxa named by Octave Parent
Endemic insects of New Zealand